Surrey Township is a civil township of Clare County in the U.S. state of Michigan. The population was 3,635 at the 2020 census.

Communities

Geography

The South Branch of the Tobacco River flows through the southern portion of the township.  The township also contains numerous lakes, including Lake Thirteen.

Major highways
 runs west–east through the center of the township.
 runs northwest-southeast diagonally through the township.

Demographics
As of the census of 2000, there were 3,555 people, 1,444 households, and 984 families residing in the township. The racial makeup of the township was 97.72% White, 0.28% African American, 0.98% Native American, 0.28% Asian, 0.11% from other races, and 0.62% from two or more races. Hispanic or Latino of any race were 1.10% of the population.

There were 1,444 households, out of which 27.2% had children under the age of 18 living with them, 54.2% were married couples living together, 10.3% had a female householder with no husband present, and 31.8% were non-families. 27.1% of all households were made up of individuals, and 12.0% had someone living alone who was 65 years of age or older.  The average household size was 2.39 and the average family size was 2.86.

In the township the population was spread out, with 22.5% under the age of 18, 7.1% from 18 to 24, 25.5% from 25 to 44, 26.0% from 45 to 64, and 19.0% who were 65 years of age or older.  The median age was 42 years. For every 100 females, there were 93.0 males.  For every 100 females age 18 and over, there were 90.4 males.

The median income for a household in the township was $28,350, and the median income for a family was $32,475. Males had a median income of $30,938 versus $21,779 for females. The per capita income for the township was $17,027.  About 7.7% of families and 11.0% of the population were below the poverty line, including 12.8% of those under age 18 and 4.2% of those age 65 or over.

Education
The entire township is served by Farwell Area Schools within the township in the village of Farwell.

References

External links
Surrey Township official website

Townships in Clare County, Michigan
Townships in Michigan
Populated places established in 1871
1871 establishments in Michigan